John E. Johnson (August 24, 1920 – February 19, 2002) was an American lawyer who served in the Mississippi House of Representatives and Mississippi State Senate.

References

1920 births
2002 deaths
20th-century American politicians
People from Amory, Mississippi
Democratic Party Mississippi state senators